I Left My Heart in Sorsogon is a Philippine television drama romance series broadcast by GMA Network. Directed by Mark Sicat Dela Cruz, it stars Heart Evangelista, Richard Yap and Paolo Contis. It premiered on November 15, 2021 on the network's Telebabad line up replacing Legal Wives. The series concluded on February 11, 2022 with a total of 65 episodes. It was replaced by First Lady in its timeslot.

Cast and characters

Lead cast
 Heart Evangelista as Celeste Diesta Estrellado
 Richard Yap as Antonio "Tonito" Wenceslao III
 Paolo Contis as Michael Angelo "Mikoy" Macedonio

Supporting cast
 Kyline Alcantara as Tiffany "Tiff" Wenceslao
 Mavy Legaspi as Sebastian "Basti" Estrellado
 Rey Abellana as Patricio Estrellado
 Shamaine Buencamino as Isadora "Adora" Estrellado
 Isay Alvarez as Lucinda Diesta-Estrellado
 Marina Benepayo as Vivian Wenceslao
 Debraliz Valasote as Ericka "Ikay" Macedonio
 Michelle Dee as Hazelyn "Hazel" Pangan
 Issa Litton as Aurelia Limjoco
 Jennie Gabriel as Mylene "May-May" Regor
 Jeniffer Maravilla as Jamaica Figueroa
 Zonia Mejia as Claudette "Clau" Pangan
 Elias Point as James Figueroa
 Victor Sy as Winston Wenceslao

Guest cast
 Bryce Eusebio as young Mikoy
 Dayara Shane as young Celeste

Production
Principal photography commenced in Sorsogon on July 19, 2021.

Episodes
<onlyinclude>

Ratings
According to AGB Nielsen Philippines' Nationwide Urban Television Audience Measurement People in television homes, the pilot episode of I Left My Heart in Sorsogon earned a 12% rating. The final episode scored a 13.6% rating.

References

External links
 
 

2021 Philippine television series debuts
2022 Philippine television series endings
Filipino-language television shows
GMA Network drama series
Philippine romance television series
Television shows set in Sorsogon